Harriet Angelina Fortescue (1825 – 1889) was a British writer on international affairs.

She was the wife of diplomat David Urquhart and wrote numerous articles in his publication, the Diplomatic Review, under the signature of Caritas. A Memoir of Mrs. Urquhart (1897) was written by Maria Catherine Bishop.

Notes

External links
Papers of David and Harriet Urquhart at the Wellcome Library.
 Papers of David and Harriet Urquhart at Balliol College, Oxford.

1825 births
1889 deaths
Harriet Angelina